Embassytown is a science fiction novel by British author China Miéville. It was published in the UK by Pan Macmillan on 6 May 2011, and in the US by Del Rey Books on 17 May 2011. A limited edition was released by Subterranean Press. The plot of the novel surrounds the town of Embassytown, the native alien residents known as Ariekei, their Language, and the human interaction with them. The novel was well reviewed and won the 2012 Locus Award for Best Science Fiction Novel.

Plot
Embassytown takes place mostly in the city of the title, on the planet Arieka. It exists on the very edge of the known universe, which given its distance from everything else, is only accessible by sailing through the "immer" (see § Style below for the meaning of Miéville's neologisms). Embassytown is a colony of a state called Bremen; and its trade goods (precious metal and, especially, alien-influenced biotech), along with Embassytown's unique position at the edge of the known universe, make  it a particularly important colony.

Avice Benner Cho, an "Immerser" (a traveller on the Immer), has returned to her childhood home from her adventures in the "Out". On the planet of Arieka humans and "exots" co-exist with the indigenous, enigmatic Ariekei—otherwise known as the Hosts. Few people can speak the language of the Hosts (referred to only as "Language"), as it requires the orator to speak two words at once; those humans (Terre) who can are genetically-engineered twins known as Ambassadors, bred solely for this purpose. The Ambassadors speak with two mouths and one mind and as such can be understood by the Ariekei (who do not recognise any other form of communication) allowing for trade in their valuable biotechnology. The Hosts' Language does not allow for lying or even speculation, the Language reflects both their state of mind and reality as they perceive it; they create literal similes by recruiting individuals to perform bizarre ordeals that can then become allusions in Language.  Avice herself serves as a human simile, “the girl who was hurt in the dark and ate what was given to her". Ariekei compete at Festivals of Lies to see who can most closely approximate speaking an untruth, an act both thrilling and highly taboo.

The relationship between humans and Ariekei has proceeded in relative tranquillity for many years (kilohours). However when a new Ambassador arrives, named , who has not been genetically engineered to speak Language, yet can still manage to, everything changes. The speech of the new, Bremen-engineered Ambassador intoxicates the Hosts and results in the entire Ariekei population becoming addicted to the Ambassador's speech regardless of content, to the extent that they cannot live without it. The situation deteriorates, and Avice is drawn into a search for a solution, having a special relationship with the Hosts as a human simile. With assistance from sympathetic Ambassadors, she trains a small group of Hosts to be able to use metaphors and eventually utter lies. Due to the interconnectedness of thought and Language, this has the effect of altering their minds and now the words of  lose their addictive properties.

Style

Often described as a book about language, Embassytown also employs fictional language, or neologisms, as a means of building its world. The author Ursula K. Le Guin describes this as follows: "When everything in a story is imaginary and much is unfamiliar, there's far too much to explain and describe, so one of the virtuosities of SF is the invention of box-words that the reader must open to discover a trove of meaning and implication". Their effect on the reader has been described as disorienting, with The Guardian James Purdon remarking on "a slow accretion of detail and implication until a universe coheres".

Characters
The names in Embassytown which are presented in fractional notation are supposed to be spoken simultaneously, by two mouths.

 Avice Benner Cho – Embassytown native and Immerser, wife to Scile and lover of CalVin
 Scile – non-native linguist and husband to Avice; believes that Language should remain as it is regardless of the consequences
  — Ambassador of high standing, lover of Avice Benner Cho
  — head Ambassador
  — new, Bremen-engineered Ambassador consisting of two non-identical people. Becomes known as the "God Drug".
 Bren – ex-Ambassador still living in Embassytown and advisor to Avice, one half of the "cleaved" Ambassador BrenDan
 Ehrsul – an "autom" (from automaton), best friend of Avice
 Wyatt – Bremen's contact in Embassytown
 Hasser – a human "simile" used by the Ariekei as part of Language.
  (or Beehive) — the most successful Ariekei liar. Hasser murders it during a Festival of Lies.
 Spanish Dancer – an Ariekei with markings reminiscent of a Spanish dancer.
 YlSib (formerly ) — ex-Ambassador living in the Host city; Bren's contact.

Development

Miéville originally had the idea for the Ariekei at age 11, in "an early draft of what became Embassytown", written while he was in school. They next featured in a short story he wrote eight years later, which Miéville intended to get published in Interzone magazine. In attempting to portray an authentically "alien" alien race, Miéville commented that he finds it almost impossible, stating "if you are a writer who happens to be a human, I think it's definitionally beyond your ken to describe something truly inhuman, psychologically, something alien."

Publication history
 2011, UK, Pan Macmillan , pub date 28 April 2011, Hardback
 2011, USA, Del Rey Books , pub date 17 May 2011, Hardback
 2011, USA, Audible, pub date 27 Jun 2011, Audiobook
 2011, USA, Subterranean Press , pub date 30 Sep 2011, Signed limited edition hardback
 2012, UK, Pan Macmillan , pub date 5 Jan 2012, Paperback
 2012, USA, Del Rey Books , pub date 31 Jan 2012, Paperback

Reception
Ursula K. Le Guin, reviewing the book for The Guardian, wrote "Embassytown is a fully achieved work of art...works on every level, providing compulsive narrative, splendid intellectual rigour and risk, moral sophistication, fine verbal fireworks and sideshows, and even the old-fashioned satisfaction of watching a protagonist become more of a person than she gave promise of being". Publishers Weekly said "Miéville's brilliant storytelling shines most when Avice works through problems and solutions that develop from the Hosts' unique and convoluted linguistic evolution, and many of the most intriguing characters are the Hosts themselves. The result is a world masterfully wrecked and rebuilt." The Scotsman stated that "Embassytown features aliens that are genuinely and thrillingly alien" and suggested "a book fundamentally concerned with the role of language as an imaginative liberation. Miéville has taken the theoretical and philosophical insights of thinkers such as Jacques Derrida and Paul Ricoeur and turned them into story.
It is not, however, a tract. There is a genuine emotional transaction at the novel's climax."

Awards

References

Sources

Further reading

External links
 

2011 British novels
British science fiction novels
Novels by China Miéville
Macmillan Publishers books
Weird fiction novels